Leistus is a genus of ground beetles in the family Carabidae. There are more than 250 described species in Leistus, found in the Holearctic.

Species
These 255 species belong to Leistus:

 Leistus acutangulus Perrault, 1979
 Leistus alaiensis Kabak, 1995
 Leistus andrewesi Perrault, 1985
 Leistus angulatus Piochard de la Brûlerie, 1872
 Leistus angulicollis Fairmaire, 1886
 Leistus angusticollis Dejean, 1826
 Leistus angustus Reitter, 1883
 Leistus apfelbecki Ganglbauer, 1891
 Leistus austriacus Schauberger, 1925
 Leistus baenningeri Roubal, 1926
 Leistus baima Farkac, 1999
 Leistus barkamensis Farkac, 1995
 Leistus barnevillei Chaudoir, 1867
 Leistus baudinoti Deuve, 1985
 Leistus becheti Allegro, 2007
 Leistus becvari Farkac, 1999
 Leistus birmanicus Perrault, 1985
 Leistus bjelasnicensis Apfelbeck, 1904
 Leistus bohdan Farkac, 1999
 Leistus bohemorum Sciaky, 1994
 Leistus brancuccii Farkac, 1995
 Leistus businskyi Dvorak, 1994
 Leistus cangshanicola Farkac, 1999
 Leistus caucasicus Chaudoir, 1867
 Leistus cavazzutii Farkac & Sciaky, 1998
 Leistus chalcites Andrewes, 1936
 Leistus championi Andrewes, 1920
 Leistus chaudoiri Perrault, 1986
 Leistus coiffaiti Perrault, 1990
 Leistus colpodes Deuve, 2018
 Leistus coltranei Allegro, 2007
 Leistus constrictus L.Schaufuss, 1862
 Leistus cordithorax Deuve, 2011
 Leistus crassus Bates, 1883
 Leistus crenatus Fairmaire, 1855
 Leistus crenifer Tschitscherine, 1903
 Leistus cyanioripennis Deuve, 2018
 Leistus cycloderus Tschitscherine, 1903
 Leistus cylindricus Sciaky, 1994
 Leistus dandoensis Deuve, 2009
 Leistus dandoensisoides Deuve, 2011
 Leistus daochengicus Deuve, 2011
 Leistus darvazicus Kabak, 2000
 Leistus denticollis Reitter, 1887
 Leistus depressus Breit, 1914
 Leistus deuvei Perrault, 1994
 Leistus deuveianus Farkac, 1995
 Leistus dongguensis Deuve, 2011
 Leistus dreuxi Deuve, 2018
 Leistus ebianensis Deuve, 2011
 Leistus elegans Rost, 1891
 Leistus ellipticus Wollaston, 1857
 Leistus elpis Ortuño; Arribas, 2021
 Leistus facchinii Farkac & Sciaky, 1998
 Leistus farkaci Sciaky, 1994
 Leistus femoralis Chaudoir, 1846
 Leistus ferganensis Semenov, 1928
 Leistus ferrugineus (Linnaeus, 1758)
 Leistus ferruginosus Mannerheim, 1843
 Leistus frater Reitter, 1897
 Leistus fujianensis Deuve & Tian, 1999
 Leistus fulvibarbis Dejean, 1826
 Leistus fulvus Chaudoir, 1846
 Leistus gansuensis Sciaky, 1995
 Leistus gaoligongensis Kavanaugh & Long, 1999
 Leistus geshizhaicus Deuve, 2011
 Leistus glacialis A.Fiori, 1899
 Leistus gracilentus Tschitscherine, 1903
 Leistus gracilis Fuss, 1860
 Leistus habashanicola Farkac, 1999
 Leistus haeckeli Farkac, 1995
 Leistus haisishanicus Farkac & Sciaky, 1998
 Leistus harpagon Farkac, 1998
 Leistus heinigeri Morvan, 1991
 Leistus heinzi Farkac, 1995
 Leistus heishuiensis Deuve & Tian, 2005
 Leistus hengduanicola Farkac, 1999
 Leistus hermonis Piochard de la Brûlerie, 1875
 Leistus himalchuliensis Perrault, 1986
 Leistus hodeberti Deuve, 2011
 Leistus hongyuanicus Farkac, 1999
 Leistus houzhenzi Farkac, 1999
 Leistus huichuanensis Deuve, 2011
 Leistus imitator Breit, 1914
 Leistus indus Tschitscherine, 1903
 Leistus inexspectatus Farkac, 1999
 Leistus insolitus Deuve, 2017
 Leistus ishikawai Perrault, 1984
 Leistus janae Farkac & Plutenko, 1992
 Leistus janatai Farkac, 1999
 Leistus janataianus Deuve, 2011
 Leistus janataicus Deuve, 2018
 Leistus jani Farkac, 1995
 Leistus jindrai Farkac, 1999
 Leistus jintangensis Deuve, 2011
 Leistus jirouxi Deuve, 2011
 Leistus jiudingensis Deuve & Tian, 2005
 Leistus juldusanus Reitter, 1913
 Leistus kalabi Farkac, 1995
 Leistus kalabianus Deuve, 2009
 Leistus kangdingensis Farkac, 1995
 Leistus kashmirensis Andrewes, 1927
 Leistus kazenasi Kabak, 2015
 Leistus ketmenicus Shilenkov & Kabak, 1994
 Leistus klarae Farkac, 1995
 Leistus kociani Farkac, 1999
 Leistus kozakai Perrault, 1984
 Leistus krali Farkac, 1993
 Leistus kratkyi Machado, 2020
 Leistus kryzhanovskii Dudko, 2003
 Leistus kubani Farkac, 1993
 Leistus kubanioides Deuve, 2011
 Leistus kucerai Farkac, 1995
 Leistus kuceraianus Deuve, 2011
 Leistus kumatai Habu, 1973
 Leistus kungeicus Shilenkov & Kabak, 1994
 Leistus kurosawai Morita, 2001
 Leistus kutpegen Kabak, 2016
 Leistus labrang Farkac, 1999
 Leistus lamugensis Deuve, 2011
 Leistus langmusianus Farkac, 1995
 Leistus lassallei Perrault, 1984
 Leistus latissimus Sciaky, 1995
 Leistus lebardicus Farkac; Putchkov & Rop, 2010
 Leistus lecordieri Deuve, 2011
 Leistus ledouxi Perrault, 1986
 Leistus ledouxianus Deuve, 2009
 Leistus lenkoranus Reitter, 1885
 Leistus lesteri Allegro, 2007
 Leistus lihengae Kavanaugh & Long, 1999
 Leistus loebli Perrault, 1985
 Leistus longipennis Casey, 1920
 Leistus lopatini Kabak, 2013
 Leistus ludmilae Dvorak, 1994
 Leistus madmeridianus Erwin, 1970
 Leistus magnicollis Motschulsky, 1866
 Leistus makaluensis Perrault, 1985
 Leistus manasluensis Dvorak, 1994
 Leistus maomao Deuve, 2008
 Leistus maoxianensis Deuve, 2011
 Leistus marcilhaci Deuve, 2011
 Leistus matsudai Morita, 2012
 Leistus megrelicus Shilenkov, 1999
 Leistus meissonnieri Deuve, 2009
 Leistus memorabilis Deuve, 2011
 Leistus minshanicus Deuve & Tian, 2005
 Leistus miroslavae Farkac & Sciaky, 1998
 Leistus mitjaevi Kabak, 2008
 Leistus montanus Stephens, 1827
 Leistus montreuili Deuve, 2009
 Leistus morvani Deuve & Tian, 2005
 Leistus moskvich Farkac, 1999
 Leistus murzini Farkac, 1999
 Leistus nanlingensis Deuve & Tian, 1999
 Leistus nanping Farkac, 1999
 Leistus nanshanicus Belousov & Kabak, 2000
 Leistus natruc Farkac, 1998
 Leistus negrei Perrault, 1985
 Leistus nepalensis Jedlicka, 1965
 Leistus niger Gebler, 1847
 Leistus niitakaensis Minowa, 1932
 Leistus nitidus (Duftschmid, 1812)
 Leistus nivium Andrewes, 1925
 Leistus noesskei Bänninger, 1932
 Leistus nokoensis Minowa, 1932
 Leistus nubicola Tschitscherine, 1903
 Leistus nubivagus Wollaston, 1864
 Leistus nyingtri Farkac, 1998
 Leistus obtusicollis Bates, 1883
 Leistus odvarkai Dvorak, 1994
 Leistus oopterus Chaudoir, 1861
 Leistus ovipennis Chaudoir, 1867
 Leistus ovitensis Perrault, 1974
 Leistus parvicollis Chaudoir, 1869
 Leistus pavesii Sciaky, 1994
 Leistus perraulti Sciaky, 1994
 Leistus perreaui Perrault, 1986
 Leistus phami Deuve, 2008
 Leistus piceus Frölich, 1799
 Leistus podsmetankou Farkac, 1999
 Leistus prolongatus Bates, 1883
 Leistus prunieri Deuve, 2011
 Leistus pseudocrenifer Sciaky, 1995
 Leistus pseudosabdeicus Deuve, 2018
 Leistus punctatissimus Breit, 1914
 Leistus puncticeps Fairmaire & Laboulbène, 1854
 Leistus punctifrons Deuve, 2008
 Leistus pyrenaeus Kraatz, 1863
 Leistus qingmaicoides Deuve, 2011
 Leistus qingmaicus Deuve, 2011
 Leistus reflexus Semenov, 1889
 Leistus reitteri Jakobson, 1906
 Leistus relictus Semenov, 1900
 Leistus rezabkovae Farkac & Wrase, 2015
 Leistus richteri Farkac, 1995
 Leistus rilongicus Deuve, 2018
 Leistus riwaensis Deuve, 2011
 Leistus rolex Morvan, 1991
 Leistus rousi Pulpan & Reska, 1977
 Leistus rouxi Deuve & Tian, 2005
 Leistus rufomarginatus (Duftschmid, 1812)
 Leistus sabdeicus Deuve, 2011
 Leistus sardous Baudi di Selve, 1883
 Leistus saueri Sciaky, 1994
 Leistus schuelkei Farkac & Wrase, 2010
 Leistus sciakyi Farkac, 1995
 Leistus sehnali Deuve, 2018
 Leistus semenovi Perrault, 1986
 Leistus sergeii Farkac, 1999
 Leistus shatanicus Deuve & Tian, 2005
 Leistus shenseensis Perrault, 1991
 Leistus shilenkovi Farkac in Löbl & Smetana, 2003
 Leistus shokini Deuve, 2011
 Leistus shuamaluko Farkac, 1995
 Leistus sichuanus Sciaky, 1994
 Leistus sikhotealinus Sundukov, 2009
 Leistus sikkimensis Perrault, 1984
 Leistus smetanai Farkac, 1995
 Leistus sogdianus Putchkov & Dolin, 1998
 Leistus spinangulus Reitter, 1913
 Leistus spinibarbis (Fabricius, 1775)
 Leistus starkei Assmann, 1997
 Leistus subaeneus Bates, 1883
 Leistus subtropicalis Deuve, 2011
 Leistus subuliformis Farkac, 1999
 Leistus taiwanensis Perrault, 1986
 Leistus tanaognathus Kavanaugh & Long, 1999
 Leistus tatianae Kabak & Putchkov, 2010
 Leistus terminatus (Panzer, 1793)
 Leistus terskeiensis Belousov & Kabak, 1992
 Leistus thibetanus Dvorak, 1994
 Leistus tiani Deuve, 2008
 Leistus toledanoi Farkac, 1999
 Leistus trabzonicus Farkac & Wrase, 2010
 Leistus tryznai Farkac, 1999
 Leistus tschitscherini Semenov, 1906
 Leistus ucrainicus Lazorko, 1954
 Leistus valcarceli Wrase; Ruiz-Tapiador & Zaballos, 1998
 Leistus vignai Sciaky, 1995
 Leistus wittmeri Perrault, 1985
 Leistus wolong Farkac & Sciaky, 1998
 Leistus wrasei Farkac & Sciaky, 1998
 Leistus wuduensis Deuve, 2018
 Leistus xinglongensis Deuve, 2011
 Leistus xuechengicus Deuve, 2011
 Leistus yajiangensis Farkac, 1995
 Leistus yajiangicus Deuve, 2018
 Leistus yanyuanensis Deuve, 2018
 Leistus yuae Deuve, 2011
 Leistus yunnanus Bänninger, 1925
 Leistus zamotajlovi Farkac & Sciaky, 1998
 Leistus zarudnyi Semenov, 1928
 Leistus zhanglaensis Deuve, 2011
 Leistus zhongdianus Farkac, 1999
 Leistus zoige Farkac, 1999

References

External links

 

 
Nebriinae
Taxa named by Josef Aloys Frölich